Helmingham is a village and civil parish in the Mid Suffolk district of Suffolk in eastern England, 12 miles (20 km) east of Stowmarket, and 12 miles north (20 km) of Ipswich. It has a population of 170, increasing to 186 at the 2011 Census.  It retains the same name by which it was recorded in the Domesday Book of 1086, namely Helmingheham, meaning 'the village of Helm's people'.

Helmingham Hall – a large red-brick quadrangular mansion – dates from the reign of Henry VIII. The ancient family of Tollemache have been seated here from an early period after settling for a while at Bentley soon after the Norman conquest of England. A Lionel Tollemache married the heiress of the Helmingham family so acquiring this estate in the 15th century.

The village was the birthplace of Faith Emmeline Backhouse, mother of the war poet John Gillespie Magee, Jr.

In 1900, excavations in the Rectory garden unearthed a cemetery, possibly Roman, containing some 25 graves.

Present day
The village is formed from the meeting of two roads, B1077 from the south-west to the north and B1079 from the south-east. Helmingham Hall is 500 metres west of this junction.

Its village church of St Mary's was first built as the estate church for the Hall.

The village appears never to have had a public house.

The church at Helmingham, St Mary's, is the church featured in a classic BBC comedy hit Only Fools and Horses, in the Christmas special "The Frog's Legacy". Most of the episode (outside scenes) was filmed in nearby Ipswich, and the church seen where they search for the grave of “Freddy Robdahl” is St Mary's. The fact that it cuts to a beach scene is in fact clever editing.

References

Villages in Suffolk
Mid Suffolk District
Civil parishes in Suffolk